Won Hye-Kyung (Hangul: 원혜경, Hanja: 元蕙敬, born 14 October 1979) is a South Korean short track speed skater, who won medals in the 1000 m and 3000 m relay at the 1998 Winter Olympics. She had already won a relay gold medal at the 1994 Winter Olympics, at the age of 14.

External links
 
 

1979 births
Living people
South Korean female speed skaters
South Korean female short track speed skaters
Olympic short track speed skaters of South Korea
Olympic gold medalists for South Korea
Olympic bronze medalists for South Korea
Olympic medalists in short track speed skating
Short track speed skaters at the 1994 Winter Olympics
Short track speed skaters at the 1998 Winter Olympics
Medalists at the 1998 Winter Olympics
Medalists at the 1994 Winter Olympics
Asian Games medalists in short track speed skating
Short track speed skaters at the 1996 Asian Winter Games
Medalists at the 1996 Asian Winter Games
Asian Games silver medalists for South Korea
21st-century South Korean women